Smilie Suri or Smiley Suri is an Indian model, actress and dancer, who appears in Bollywood films. Suri made her Bollywood debut with the 2005 film, Kalyug, which was directed by her brother "Mohit Suri". The film turned out to be a certified box office huge success.

She is the older sister of film director Mohit Suri and the niece of Mahesh Bhatt and Mukesh Bhatt. as well as the cousin of Pooja Bhatt, Alia Bhatt and Emraan Hashmi.

Career
Smiley had assisted her director brother Mohit during the making of the 2005 film, Zeher, which turned out to be a moderate success. Smiley Suri did one film, N. Chandra's Yeh Mera India after Kalyug. It had Anupam Kher, Seema Biswas and Rajpal Yadav. Unfortunately, it did not work. Then Smiley did a special appearance in Crook for her brother Mohit Suri. Then she shot for 'Downtown', which did not release.

Personal life
Smiley's maternal uncles are Mahesh Bhatt and Mukesh Bhatt while her first cousins are actors Emraan Hashmi, Pooja Bhatt, Alia Bhatt and Rahul Bhatt. Suri is very close to her brother Mohit and to her nephew, Ayaan Hashmi, the son of her cousin Emraan Hashmi and his wife Parveen. She is a trained dancer and was training for the Olympics, before she was offered Kalyug in 2005 and became a path-breaking actor. Suri was with Bollywood choreographer Shiamak Davar's group for five years and has also been trained by Sandeep Soparrkar. She has also learnt Kathak from Kathak guru, Vijayshree Choudhary.

Suri has maintained a low profile and is no longer into movies. Smilie married Vineet Bangera in July 2014.

Filmography

Films

Television

References

External links
 
 Official Twitter Profile 
 Smilie Suri at GetInfy.com

Living people
Actresses from Mumbai
Female models from Mumbai
Indian film actresses
Indian television actresses
Actresses in Hindi cinema
Actresses in Hindi television
Participants in Indian reality television series
Year of birth missing (living people)